The Stadtbahnwagen Typ B (translation Type "B" Light Rail Vehicle, short form B-Wagen) is a light rail vehicle used by several Stadtbahn networks in the German state of North Rhine-Westphalia as well as by the Bursaray network in Bursa, Turkey. It was mainly developed by Düsseldorf-based Duewag, who also built the majority of vehicles in a consortium with Siemens and Kiepe. A small series of ten units was built by Waggon Union in Berlin. As the type evolved over two decades of production, some vehicles have little more in common than their outer dimensions and the basic configuration of a two-part multiple unit on three bogies with both outer ones powered. For the Dortmund Stadtbahn, some cars were modified with a central section and a fourth bogie. These vehicles are referred to as B8 or  B80C/8 (eight axles).

History 
When the Rhine-Ruhr Stadtbahn network was planned in the early 1970s, standardised rolling stock was planned as well. At the same time, a second Stadtbahn network was planned for Cologne and Bonn. Because the future Cologne Stadtbahn already had one finished tunnel, that was built with the city's own money with streetcars in mind, the Stadtbahnwagen designed for the Rhine-Ruhr network was not suitable. So, another vehicle was designed for the Cologne/Bonn network, that was capable of driving though tighter curves. This vehicle, now referred to as Stadtbahnwagen Typ B was immediately ordered by transport authorities in Cologne and Bonn, while Rhine-Ruhr authorities remained hesitant about "their" vehicle, now renamed Stadtbahnwagen Typ A. Eventually it was decided that the type "A" LRV was too unwieldy and type "B" LRVs were ordered by Essen, Mülheim, Düsseldorf, Duisburg, Dortmund and Bochum. The type "A" concept, which consists of close coupled two-car sets, was shelved and later revived for the Stuttgart Stadtbahn.

The Typ B formed the basis for the British-built Metrocars on the Tyne and Wear Metro, which opened in 1980.

Subtypes 
Different variants are usually referred to by a combination of their top speed and a letter denoting the engine type.

References

Duewag tram vehicles
Tram vehicles of Germany
Electric multiple units of Germany
750 V DC multiple units